An Ortsbezirk is an administrative division of the city of Frankfurt in Germany, and other towns in Hesse and Rhineland-Palatinate.

Frankfurt comprises 16 Ortsbezirke which are subdivided into 46 quarters or city districts. While Frankfurt citizens identify themselves more with the city district they live in, Ortsbezirke are the highest political divisions of the city. Each Ortsbezirk has a district committee and chairperson.

List
The 16 Ortsbezirke of Frankfurt are:

External links